Carpiquet is a commune in the Calvados department in the Normandy region in northwestern France. Caen – Carpiquet Airport is located in Carpiquet.

Geography
Carpiquet is on the western side of the Caen metropolitan area. The town is divided into four distinct areas:
the town centre;
the commercial area along the Ligne de Paris - Caen and Route nationale 13 to the north;
the Bellevue area to the east;
the Caen - Carpiquet Airport to the west.

History

The Carpiquet Airport was one of the objectives of the 3rd Canadian Infantry Division during the Normandy Campaign. The village was fought over between June and July 1944 in several battles, notably during the Battle for Caen.  It and the airport were finally taken in early July during Operation Windsor.

Population

Attractions
Parc Festyland, an amusement park in Carpiquet. The park lies next to the Caen ring road and receives 110,000 visitors per year.

Economy
Chalair Aviation, an airline, has its head office on the grounds of Caen – Carpiquet Airport in Carpiquet.

International relations

Carpiquet is twinned with North Baddesley, United Kingdom.

See also

Communes of the Calvados department

References

Communes of Calvados (department)